Open Firmware is a standard defining the interfaces of a computer firmware system, formerly endorsed by the Institute of Electrical and Electronics Engineers (IEEE). It originated at Sun Microsystems, where it was known as OpenBoot, and has been used by vendors including Sun, Apple, IBM and ARM. Open Firmware allows the system to load platform-independent drivers directly from a PCI device, improving compatibility.

Open Firmware may be accessed through its command line interface, which uses the Forth programming language.

Open Firmware is described by IEEE standard IEEE 1275-1994, which was not reaffirmed by the Open Firmware Working Group (OFWG) since 1998 and has therefore been officially withdrawn by IEEE.

Several commercial implementations of Open Firmware have been released to the Open Source community in 2006, including Sun OpenBoot, Firmworks OpenFirmware and Codegen SmartFirmware. The source code is available from the OpenBIOS project. Sun's implementation is available under a BSD license.

Features 

Open Firmware defines a standard way to describe the hardware configuration of a system, called the device tree. This helps the operating system to better understand the configuration of the host computer, relying less on user configuration and hardware polling. For example, Open Firmware is essential for reliably identifying slave I2C devices like temperature sensors for hardware monitoring, whereas the alternative solution of performing a blind probe of the I2C bus, as has to be done by software like lm_sensors on generic hardware, is known to result in serious hardware issues under certain circumstances.

Open Firmware Forth Code may be compiled into FCode, a bytecode which is independent of instruction set architecture. A PCI card may include a program, compiled to FCode, which runs on any Open Firmware system. In this way, it can provide boot-time diagnostics, configuration code, and device drivers. FCode is also very compact, so that a disk driver may require only one or two kilobytes. Therefore, many of the same I/O cards can be used on Sun systems and Macintoshes that used Open Firmware. FCode implements ANS Forth and a subset of the Open Firmware library.

Being based upon an interactive programming language, Open Firmware can be used to efficiently test and bring up new hardware. It allows drivers to be written and tested interactively. Operational video and mouse drivers are the only prerequisite for a graphical interface suitable for end-user diagnostics. Apple shipped such a diagnostic "operating system" in many Power Macintoshes. Sun also shipped an FCode-based diagnostic tool suite called OpenBoot Diagnostics (OBDiag) used by customer service support and hardware manufacturing teams

Access 
On Sun SPARC systems, the Open Firmware interface is displayed on the console terminal before the bootstrapping of the system software. If a keyboard is connected, the main video display will be used as the console terminal and Open Firmware can be re-entered at any time by pressing  on the keyboard. If no keyboard is connected, then the first serial line on the system is usually used as the console and Open Firmware is re-entered by sending a "Break" on the serial line. While the system software is running, various Open Firmware settings can be read or written using the eeprom command.

On a PowerPC-based Macintosh, the Open Firmware interface can be accessed by pressing the keys  at startup ( if using standard PC USB keyboard). Intel-based Macintoshes do not use Open Firmware; they use Extensible Firmware Interface. Also, early versions (before the PowerBook 3400) connect Open Firmware's input and output to the Modem port by default. This functionality is generally only used by developers or troubleshooting I.T. personnel; for common users, the Mac OS X operating system provides a high level graphical user interface to change commonly used Open Firmware settings. For instance, it is possible to specify the boot disk or partition without directly using the Open Firmware interface, but with some limitations (e.g. it is not possible to select boot from USB mass-storage devices, but Open Firmware allows iMac to boot using boot ud:,\\:tbxi  command). Other Open Firmware settings can be changed using the nvram command while the system software is running.

On Pegasos, the interface is accessed by pressing  at startup.

On IBM Power Systems, Open Firmware ("ok" prompt) can be accessed through the SMS Boot Menu. SMS Boot Menu can be accessed by pressing  or  during the boot sequence, after hardware checking, and just before the OS boot.

On the OLPC XO-1 laptop, Open Firmware access requires a developer key, that can be obtained after registration with OLPC.

See also 

 BIOS
 Libreboot
 Coreboot
 PowerPC Reference Platform
 Common Hardware Reference Platform
 Das U-Boot
 Input/output base address
 OpenBIOS
 Power-on self-test
 UEFI
 Advanced RISC Computing
 System Reference Manual

References

External links 
 OPEN FIRMWARE HOME PAGE (via  Internet Archive)
 Sun's OpenBoot 2.x command reference manual (Revision A, November 1995)
 Sun's SPARC OpenBoot 4.x command reference manual
 The last IEEE 1275 text
 Firmworks OpenFirmware source code
 Codegen SmartFirmware source code
 Boot Process on IBM POWER (via  Internet Archive)
 OFW FAQ on OLPC Wiki
 Aurora SPARC Linux OBP reference guide (via  Internet Archive)
 Quick Reference
 TinyBoot aka Tiny Open Firmware: an embeddable OpenFirmware-like system for small CPUs (via  Internet Archive)

Firmware
Sun Microsystems software
IEEE standards
Macintosh firmware
BIOS
Open-source hardware
MacOS
Forth programming language family